2 Hao Hangzhanlou (Terminal 2) station is a station on the Capital Airport Express of the Beijing Subway, serving Terminal 2 at Beijing Capital International Airport.

Station layout 
The station has an underground single-sided platform.

References

Beijing Subway stations in Chaoyang District
Airport railway stations in China